Great Stage Park is a 650-acre (2.63 km2) outdoor event space located  southeast of Nashville in Manchester, Tennessee. Since 2002 it has been home to the Bonnaroo Music and Arts Festival, the largest outdoor festival in North America. It was also the site of the upcoming Exit 111 Festival in October 2019. When not hosting festivals, the site or “The Farm” as most people know it as, remains virtually unused. The “What Stage”, fountain, permanent bathrooms, barn, and a few other small buildings are the only permanent buildings on site. Every other structure is assembled for the festivals only.

References

External links
 GreatStagePark.com Official Site
 Bonnaroo.com Official Bonnaroo Music & Arts Festival website

Bonnaroo Music Festival
Music venues in Tennessee
Buildings and structures in Coffee County, Tennessee
Tourist attractions in Coffee County, Tennessee